The 2022 New Hampshire Executive Council elections will take place on November 8, 2022, to elect all five members of the Executive Council of New Hampshire. The party primaries were held on September 13.

District 1 
After redistricting, the 1st district includes six of New Hampshire's thirteen charter cities: Berlin, Dover, Franklin, Laconia, Rochester, and Somersworth. Towns in the district include Alton, Belmont, Conway, Durham, Farmington, Gilford, Meredith, Wakefield, and Wolfeboro. The incumbent is Republican Joseph Kenney. Kenney, first elected in 2014 special election, is running for re-election.

Republican nominee 
 Joseph Kenney, incumbent executive councilor

Democratic nominee 
 Dana Hilliard, mayor of Somersworth

General election

District 2 
After redistricting, the 2nd district includes four of New Hampshire's thirteen charter cities: Claremont, Concord, Keene, and Lebanon. Towns in the district include Bow, Charlestown, Hanover, Henniker, Hopkinton, Littleton, Newport, Peterborough, and Plymouth. The incumbent is Democrat Cinde Warmington. First elected in 2020, Warmington is running for re-election.

Democratic primary

Candidates 
 Michael Cryans, former District 1 Executive Councilor
 Bradford Todd
 Cinde Warmington, incumbent executive councilor

Results

Republican primary

Candidates 
 Harold French, state senator
 Kim Strathdee, cook, antiques seller, farmer, carpenter, mechanic, and candidate for Executive Council District 2 in 2018 and 2020

Results

General election

District 3 
After redistricting, the 3rd district includes one of New Hampshire's thirteen charter cities, Portsmouth. Towns in the district include Atkinson, Chester, Epping, Exeter, Hampstead, Hampton, Kingston, Newmarket, Pelham, Plaistow, Raymond, Rye, Salem, Sandown, Seabrook, Stratham, and Windham. The incumbent is Republican Janet Stevens, who was first elected in 2020. Stevens is running for re-election.

Republican nominee 
 Janet Stevens, incumbent executive councilor

Democratic nominee 
 Katherine Harake, chair of the Hampton Budget Committee

General election

District 4 
After redistricting, the 4th district includes one of New Hampshire's thirteen charter cities, Manchester. Towns in the district include Auburn, Barrington, Bedford, Goffstown, Hooksett, Londonderry, Loudon, Nottingham, and Pembroke. The incumbent is Republican Ted Gatsas, who was first elected in 2018. Gatsas is running for re-election.

Republican primary

Candidates 
 Ted Gatsas, incumbent executive councilor
 Terese Grinnell, activist

Results

Democratic nominee 
 Kevin Cavanaugh, state senator

General election

District 5 
After redistricting, the 5th district includes one of New Hampshire's thirteen charter cities, Nashua. Towns in the district include Amherst, Brookline, Hillsborough, Hollis, Hudson, Jaffrey, Litchfield, Merrimack, Milford, New Boston, New Ipswich, Rindge, Swanzey, and Weare. The incumbent is Republican Dave Wheeler, who was first elected in 2020. Wheeler is running for re-election.

Republican primary

Candidates 
 Anne Copp, former state representative
 Dave Wheeler, incumbent executive councilor

Results

Democratic nominee 
 Shoshanna Kelly, at-large Nashua alderwoman

General election

See also 
 2022 New Hampshire elections
 2022 New Hampshire gubernatorial election
 2022 United States Senate election in New Hampshire
 2022 United States House of Representatives elections in New Hampshire

References 

Executive Council
2022
New Hampshire Executive Council